The 2010 World University Squash Championship is the edition of the 2010s World University Squash, which serves as the individual world squash championship for students. The event took place in Melbourne in Australia from 10 July to 18 July.

Draw and results

Men's Single

Women's Single

Team Event

See also
World University Squash Championships
World Squash Federation

References

External links
SquashSite World University 2010 website

Squash tournaments in Australia
World University
World University Squash Championships
World University Squash Championships
Squash